In chemistry, the molar absorption coefficient or molar attenuation coefficient is a measurement of how strongly a chemical species absorbs, and thereby attenuates, light at a given wavelength. It is an intrinsic property of the species. The SI unit of molar absorption coefficient is the square metre per mole, but in practice, quantities are usually expressed in terms of M−1⋅cm−1 or L⋅mol−1⋅cm−1 (the latter two units are both equal to ). In older literature, the cm2/mol is sometimes used; 1 M−1⋅cm−1 equals 1000 cm2/mol. The molar absorption coefficient is also known as the molar extinction coefficient  and molar absorptivity, but the use of these alternative terms has been discouraged by the IUPAC.

Beer–Lambert law
The absorbance of a material that has only one absorbing species also depends on the pathlength and the concentration of the species, according to the Beer–Lambert law

where
 is the molar absorption coefficient of that material;
 is the molar concentration of those species;
 is the path length.

Different disciplines have different conventions as to whether absorbance is decadic (10-based) or Napierian (e-based), i.e., defined with respect to the transmission via common logarithm (log10) or a natural logarithm (ln). The molar absorption coefficient is usually decadic. When ambiguity exists, it is best to indicate which one applies.

When there are N absorbing species in a solution, the overall absorbance is the sum of the absorbances for each individual species i:

The composition of a mixture of N absorbing species can be found by measuring the absorbance at N wavelengths (the values of the molar absorption coefficient for each species at these wavelengths must also be known). The wavelengths chosen are usually the wavelengths of maximum absorption (absorbance maxima) for the individual species. None of the wavelengths may be an isosbestic point for a pair of species. The set of the following simultaneous equations can be solved to find the concentrations of each absorbing species:

The molar absorption coefficient (in units of cm2) is directly related to the attenuation cross section via the Avogadro constant NA:

Mass absorption coefficient
The mass absorption coefficient is equal to the molar absorption coefficient divided by the molar mass of the absorbing species.

 = 
where
 = Mass absorption coefficient
 = Molar absorption coefficient
 = Molar mass of the absorbing species

Proteins
In biochemistry, the molar absorption coefficient of a protein at  depends almost exclusively on the number of aromatic residues, particularly tryptophan, and can be predicted from the sequence of amino acids. Similarly, the molar absorption coefficient of nucleic acids at  can be predicted given the nucleotide sequence.

If the molar absorption coefficient is known, it can be used to determine the concentration of a protein in solution.

References

External links
Nikon MicroscopyU: Introduction to Fluorescent Proteins includes a table of molar attenuation coefficient of fluorescent proteins.

Analytical chemistry
Absorption spectroscopy